John Flack may refer to:
 John Flack (bishop), English Anglican bishop
 John Flack (British politician), former member of the European Parliament
 John T. Flack, former member of the New York State Assembly